Stacy Lee Bregman (born 7 October 1986) is a South African professional golfer playing on the Ladies European Tour (LET).

Amateur career
In her amateur career, Bregman won the Saab Junior twice. She was semi-finalist in the South African Amateur in 2005 and 2006 and reached the final 16 in the 2006 British Ladies Amateur Championship. She played on the winning South African Espirito Santo Trophy team in 2006 together with Kelli Shean and Ashleigh Simon.

Professional career
Bregman joined the Ladies European Tour in 2007. Over her first 12 seasons, she finished top-10 17 times including runner-up at the 2008 Turkish Ladies Open, 2013 South African Women's Open and 2018 Lacoste Ladies Open de France. After finishing 11th in 2018, she finished 35th on the 2019 Order of Merit.

Bregman played on the 2018 Symetra Tour where she recorded one top-10 finish at the Forsyth Classic.

Professional wins (5)

Sunshine Ladies Tour wins (5)
2014 (1) Zambia Ladies Open
2015 (3) Sun International Ladies Challenge, Dimension Data Ladies Pro-Am, Cape Town Ladies Open
2018 (1) Canon Ladies Tshwane Open

Results in LPGA majors
Results not in chronological order.

^ The Evian Championship was added as a major in 2013.

CUT = missed the half-way cut
"T" = tied

Team appearances
Amateur
Espirito Santo Trophy (representing South Africa): 2006 (winners)

References

External links

South African female golfers
Ladies European Tour golfers
Sportspeople from Johannesburg
1986 births
Living people